Guangzhou–Shenzhen intercity railway or Suishen intercity railway is a commuter railway in the Pearl River Delta of Guangdong, China. The construction route traces roughly along the east bank of the Pearl River, connecting Guangzhou, Dongguan and Shenzhen Bao'an International Airport.

This is the third railway between Guangzhou and Shenzhen. It is slower than the Guangzhou–Shenzhen–Hong Kong Express Rail Link but faster than the Guangzhou–Shenzhen railway.

History
Route planning in 2009 within Guangzhou changed several times and then a big change, with Xintang in Guangzhou's Zengcheng District chosen as the originating point, straight into Hongmei, Dongguan. This changed the access to the Guangzhou Metro to Line 13, with future access to the planned Line 16. Guangzhou–Dongguan–Shenzhen intercity railway originally planned to through operate into Shenzhen Metro's Line 11 to Futian station in central Shenzhen. However, in September 2010, it was announced that this railway will no longer enter through operate via Line 11 into Shenzhen city center and designed as a separate railway service.

Chronology
 21 December 2008 – Construction started.
 25 November 2009 – Dongguan–Changan segment started
 6 June 2012 – Deletion of Mayong station from plans.
 21 September 2012 – Dongguan–Shenzhen section started.
 17 October 2012 – Planning extends to Guangzhou East railway station, with renovating and running alongside the Guangzhou-Shenzhen Railway corridor and the transformation of Jishan and Shipai stations will be upgraded for intercity use.
 6 December 2012 – Shenzhen route basically established, with two sites in Shenzhen: Airport East station and Qianhaiwan station.
 14 May 2013 – Shenzhen section of the railway adjusted again, terminating at Airport Station, cancelling this line running to Airport East and Qianhaiwan stations.

Station list

Future development

Northern extension (Xinbaiguang intercity railway)
It is planned in the future to extend this railway further north eventually extending to Guangzhou Baiyun Airport and Guangzhou North railway station. The extension from Xintang South to Guangzhou North is also known as Xinbaiguang intercity railway.

Southern extension
Originally, The Suishen ICR was planned to enter central Shenzhen. The line was cut back to Shenzhen Airport in 2010. The expansion of the line south of Shenzhen Airport was proposed again in 2019 but this time only up to Qianhai. In June 2020, NDRC approved a further extension beyond Qianhai deeper in to central Shenzhen. The southern extension is expected to be complete in 2025.

Others
There are also possible links with the proposed Hong Kong–Shenzhen Western Express Railway, allowing for cross-border services and an eventual rail link between Hong Kong Airport with Shenzhen Airport and Guangzhou Airport.

Notes

References

High-speed railway lines in China
Rail transport in Guangdong
Airport rail links in China
25 kV AC railway electrification